Estonian Underwater Federation (abbreviation EUF) is one of the sport governing bodies in Estonia which deals with underwater sports.

EUF is a member of World Underwater Federation (CMS) and Estonian Olympic Committee.

References

External links
 

Sports governing bodies in Estonia
Water sports in Estonia